L. maritimum may refer to:
 Lilium maritimum, the coast lily, a plant species endemic to California
 Litopleura maritimum, a synonym for Limnomedusa macroglossa

See also
 Maritimum (disambiguation)